Hunter Lawrence (born August 1, 1999) is a professional Motocross racer for HRC Honda. He competes in both the Supercross and AMA Motocross championships.

Career Results

References